1764 Cogshall, provisional designation , is a carbonaceous Themistian asteroid from the outer regions of the asteroid belt, approximately 26 kilometers in diameter. It was discovered on 7 November 1953, by astronomers of the Indiana Asteroid Program at Goethe Link Observatory in Indiana, United States. The asteroid was named after Wilbur Cogshall, professor of astronomy at Indiana University.

Orbit and classification 

Cogshall is a Themistian asteroid that belongs to the Themis family, a very large family of carbonaceous asteroids, named after 24 Themis. It orbits the Sun in the outer main-belt at a distance of 2.7–3.5 AU once every 5 years and 5 months (1,987 days). Its orbit has an eccentricity of 0.12 and an inclination of 2° with respect to the ecliptic.

Physical characteristics

Rotation period 

In May 2005, a rotational lightcurve of Cogshall was obtained from photometric observations by French amateur astronomer Pierre Antonini. Lightcurve analysis gave a well-defined rotation period of 3.62417 hours with a brightness variation of 0.21 magnitude.

Observations at the Palomar Transient Factory in 2012, gave a concurring period of 3.624 and 3.630 hours with an amplitude of 0.22 and 0.20 magnitude in the R- and S-band, respectively.

Diameter and albedo 

According to the surveys carried out by the Infrared Astronomical Satellite IRAS, the Japanese Akari satellite and the NEOWISE mission of NASA's Wide-field Infrared Survey Explorer, Cogshall measures between 25.14 and 29.671 kilometers in diameter and its surface has an albedo between 0.0606 and 0.109.

The Collaborative Asteroid Lightcurve Link derives an albedo of 0.0712 and a diameter of 26.13 kilometers based on an absolute magnitude of 11.4.

Naming 

This minor planet was named after American astronomer Wilbur A. Cogshall, who was a professor of astronomy at Indiana University and director of the Kirkwood Observatory for more than four decades (1900–1944). His research included visual binary stars and the photography of solar eclipses. The name was proposed by Frank K. Edmondson, who initiated the Indiana Asteroid Program. The official  was published by the Minor Planet Center on 20 February 1971.

References

External links 
 Asteroid Lightcurve Database (LCDB), query form (info )
 Dictionary of Minor Planet Names, Google books
 Asteroids and comets rotation curves, CdR – Observatoire de Genève, Raoul Behrend
 Discovery Circumstances: Numbered Minor Planets (1)-(5000) – Minor Planet Center
 
 

001764
001764
Named minor planets
19531107